Charles Henry Schunke (21 March 1879 – 20 August 1924) was an Australian rules footballer who played with Carlton in the Victorian Football League (VFL).

One of his brothers, Ernest Wilfred Schunke (1882–1922), played for Richmond.

Notes

External links 

Charlie Schunke's profile at Blueseum

1879 births
Australian rules footballers from Melbourne
Carlton Football Club players
1924 deaths
People from Carlton, Victoria